The Karate Federation of Armenia, also known as the Armenian National Karate Federation, is the regulating body of karate in Armenia, governed by the Armenian Olympic Committee. The headquarters of the federation is located in Yerevan.

History
The Federation is currently led by president Grigory Mikayelyan. The Federation is a full member of the World Karate Federation and the European Karate Federation. The Federation manages several karate clubs and sub-organizations throughout the country. Armenian karate athletes participate in various international karate competitions, including the Karate World Championships and the European Karate Championships.

Activities
The Federation organizes the annual Armenian Karate Championships. In 2021, the 33rd Armenian Karate Championships were held in the Mika Sports Arena. The event brought together athletes across Armenia and from Artsakh.

See also
 Armenian Kyokushin Karate Federation
 Armenian Shotokan Karate Federation
 Sport in Armenia

References

External links 
 Official Website
 Karate Federation of Armenia on Facebook

Sports governing bodies in Armenia
Karate in Armenia
Karate organizations